Robert Senkler is the former chairman of Securian Financial Group. He served as CEO from 1994-2014.  Robert started with Minnesota Life - Securian Financial Group as an actuarial trainee in 1974, and eventually worked his way up to vice president in 1984.  He currently serves on the boards of HealthEast Care System and Hubbard Broadcasting.  In 2001 Robert was awarded the BestPrep Humanitarian Award, and in 2003 he was inducted into the University of Minnesota Duluth Academy of Science and Engineering.  Senkler graduated from the University of Minnesota Duluth in 1974 with a degree in mathematics.

References

http://www.advantuscapital.com/adv/Bios/Senkler.html
http://www.d.umn.edu/publications/bridge/1108/senkler.html
http://www.loma-tc.com/bobsenkler
http://www.bizjournals.com/twincities/stories/2006/01/09/focus1.html

University of Minnesota Duluth alumni
American chief executives of financial services companies
Living people
Year of birth missing (living people)